

Regional Corporations

134 Local Areas were contested in 14 Corporations.

 Diego Martin Regional Corporation
 Port of Spain City Corporation
 San Juan–Laventille Regional Corporation
 Tunapuna–Piarco Regional Corporation
 Arima Borough Corporation
 Sangre Grande Regional Corporation
 Chaguanas Borough Corporation
 Couva–Tabaquite–Talparo Regional Corporation
 San Fernando City Corporation
 Princes Town Regional Corporation
 Penal–Debe Regional Corporation
 Siparia Regional Corporation
 Point Fortin Borough Corporation
 Rio Claro–Mayaro Regional Corporation

The results are as follows:

San Fernando City Corporation

1999 elections in the Caribbean
1999 in Trinidad and Tobago
1999